David Terrell Reid (born September 17, 1973) is a former boxer from Philadelphia, Pennsylvania.

Amateur career
Reid had a stellar amateur boxing career, culminating with a come-from-behind, one-punch knock out win to secure a gold medal at the 1996 summer Olympics in Atlanta, Georgia.  This followed Reid's title victory a year earlier at the 1995 Pan American Games in Mar del Plata. Because he was, like Oscar De La Hoya four years before, the only Olympic gold medalist in boxing for the United States, comparisons by writers and critics to de la Hoya were practically inevitable. De la Hoya's nickname is "The Golden Boy"; Reid was dubbed as "The American Dream".

Amateur highlights
1993 National Golden Gloves Welterweight champion
1994 United States Amateur Welterweight champion
1996 United States Amateur Light middleweight champion
Won the Light Middleweight gold medal for the United States at the 1996 Olympics in Atlanta, United States. His results were:
Defeated Wan-Kyun Lee (South Korea) 20-4
Defeated Pavol Polakovič (Czech Republic) 12-5
Defeated Mohamed Marmouri (Tunisia) 13-8
Defeated Karim Tulaganov (Uzbekistan) 12-4
Defeated Alfredo Duvergel (Cuba) KO 3 (0:36)

Pro career
Reid began his professional career, with much attention from boxing magazines, when he defeated Sam Calderon on March 21, 1997, by a unanimous four round decision, in Atlantic City, New Jersey.

He followed his debut victory with four knockout wins in a row, before meeting former world Welterweight champion Jorge Vaca, on October 3 of the same year, also at Atlantic City. He knocked Vaca out in the first round.

His next bout, against Dan Conolly, was showcased on HBO Boxing, and it was also covered, round by round, by The Ring. Reid earned his sixth victory in a row, knocking out Conolly (who was described by The Ring magazine as a "game opponent") in five rounds.

On January 31, 1998, he dropped Robert Frazier in the first round. Despite losing a point in round six due to what the fight's referee thought was dirty tactics, Reid went on to beat Frazier by an eight round unanimous decision.

After two more wins, he faced former world champion Simon Brown, knocking him out in four rounds on June 27, at Reid's hometown. On October 24, he claimed his first belt, defeating James Cocker by a twelve round unanimous decision, to win the WBC's Continental Americas light middleweight title.

WBA light middleweight champion

After that victory, he was deemed as ready for a world title try by his management team, and so, on March 6, 1999, Reid became a world champion in only his tenth professional bout (making him one of the boxers to win a world title in the fastest time, also like the second Davey Moore), by beating WBA light middleweight champion Laurent Boudouani by a twelve round unanimous decision in Atlantic City.

Reid would defend his title successfully twice, one of them, a twelve round unanimous decision over Keith Mullings in Las Vegas.

By then, Reid had already made Las Vegas his new home. There was much talk about facing him against a number of opponents, including Roy Jones Jr., Bernard Hopkins, De La Hoya and Félix Trinidad.

Trinidad vs Reid Bout 

The only fight out of those four possible match-ups came on March 3, 2000, when he defended his crown against Trinidad in Las Vegas. Reid enjoyed some advantage during the first six rounds, having dropped Trinidad in the third, and with the fight being close on all three judges' scorecards. He was dropped in round seven, however, and subsequently suffered a detached retina and three more knockdowns in round eleven, before losing the world title by a twelve round unanimous decision.

Many fans then questioned his management's judgment by letting Reid defend his title against a veteran like Trinidad in only his fifteenth professional bout, a fact that reminded many of the case of the second Davey Moore 17 years before, when he defended the same WBA title, in only his thirteenth bout, against the far more experienced, boxing hall of famer Roberto Durán. Many critics say that the reason for Reid's falldown after his defeat to Trinidad could be due to a psychological break-down, but the fact is that his detached retina affected him for the rest of his short career.

Retirement
He returned to the boxing ring for four bouts. He won three fights against insignificant opposition, then lost to Sam Hill by a knockout in nine rounds, in what would turn out to be his last bout, on November 11, 2001, at Elizabeth, Indiana. His retina was causing him more trouble, and he retired before losing his eyesight.  Reid had first suffered an eye injury in the 1995 Olympic Trials, and after several surgeries as a professional, he continued to suffer from ptosis.

Reid had a professional record of 17 wins and two losses, with 7 wins by knockout.

External links 
 

1973 births
Living people
Light-middleweight boxers
Boxers from Philadelphia
Boxers at the 1995 Pan American Games
Boxers at the 1996 Summer Olympics
Olympic boxers of the United States
Winners of the United States Championship for amateur boxers
National Golden Gloves champions
American male boxers
Olympic gold medalists for the United States in boxing
Medalists at the 1996 Summer Olympics
Pan American Games gold medalists for the United States
Pan American Games medalists in boxing
People with ptosis (eyelid)
Medalists at the 1995 Pan American Games